Cerobasis canariensis is a species of Psocoptera from the Trogiidae family that can be found on Canary Islands and in Germany.

References

Trogiidae
Insects described in 1910
Psocoptera of Europe